Doreen Anne Rosenthal  (born 1938) is an Australian academic and adolescent sexual health and women's health researcher. As of 2020 she is  Professor Emerita in the School of Population Health at La Trobe University and Honorary Professor in the Melbourne School of Population and Global Health at the University of Melbourne.

Academic career 
Born Doreen Anne Lapin in Melbourne, Victoria in 1938, Rosenthal matriculated from MacRobertson Girls' High School in 1955. Married and with three young children, Rosenthal graduated from the University of Melbourne in 1972 with a BA, majoring in psychology. Continuing at that university, she then completed a PhD in 1975 with her thesis titled An investigation of some factors influencing development of formal operational thinking.

Her research has included studies of homeless young people, their drug use, why they leave home and their HIV risk. Another focus of her research has been women's sexual health. She has also studied ethical questions in research and collaborated on projects in Botswana, Indonesia and Vietnam.

Honours and recognition 
Rosenthal was elected a Fellow of the Academy of the Social Sciences in Australia in 1998. She was made an Officer of the Order of Australia in the 2003 Australia Day Honours for "outstanding service nationally and internationally to understanding of and research into adolescent health, particularly in the fields of sexual health and HIV/AIDS". In 2007 she was inducted onto the Victorian Honour Roll of Women.

Selected works

References

External links 

 Curriculum Vitae dated 12 August 2013

1938 births
Living people
Officers of the Order of Australia
Fellows of the Academy of the Social Sciences in Australia
Academics from Melbourne
Academic staff of the University of Melbourne
Academic staff of La Trobe University
Australian psychologists
University of Melbourne alumni
People educated at Mac.Robertson Girls' High School
20th-century Australian women
21st-century Australian women